Keewatin Air (IATA: FK) is an airline that operates from Winnipeg, Manitoba, Canada. The airline was started by Frank Robert May (who had been a pilot for Lamb Air) and his wife Judy Saxby in 1971, in the Keewatin Region, then part of the Northwest Territories.

It was formed as "Keewatin Air Limited" to provide charter services to the region. It was the first airline to have a permanent base in Nunavut (then known as the Keewatin Region of the Northwest Territories). In 1987 it expanded to include medical evacuation (MEDEVAC) services, to what would become the Kivalliq Region, using a fleet of aircraft that began with a Tradewind aircraft - a multi-modified Beech 18 with a turbine engine and tricycle gear. This aircraft was followed by a Westwind, another modified Beech 18 with turbine engines and eventually these were replaced by Merlin IIA aircraft that had the added benefit of being pressurized and had turboprops. The MEDEVAC service is now known as "Nunavut Lifeline". Currently three Kingair 200 aircraft are based in Rankin Inlet, one in Churchill, Manitoba. and two in Iqaluit, where the airline also bases a Lear 35 for the long hauls to Ottawa and a Pilatus PC-12 to access the short strips.

In 1998 the company formed Kivalliq Air to provide scheduled air service within the Kivalliq Region and to Winnipeg and Churchill. That service has since been cancelled.

In 2005 the company was sold to Exchange Industrial Income Fund (now Exchange Income Corporation), owners of Perimeter Aviation, Bearskin Airlines and Calm Air. May and Saxby continued to manage the airline for a short period after the sale.

Destinations

Charter services are available to destinations throughout North America.

Fleet 
As of February 2011 the following 24 aircraft were registered with Transport Canada and at least 9 listed with Keewatin Air.

Accidents and incidents
 On December 22, 2012, a Fairchild Metro 3/23 twin-engine turboprop aircraft belonging to Perimeter Aviation but chartered by Kivalliq Air crashed near the end of the runway at Sanikiluaq Airport in northern Canada, killing a six-month-old baby and injuring the eight other people on board. The cause was not immediately known.

References

External links

Keewatin Air official site

Air Transport Association of Canada
Regional airlines of Nunavut
Airlines established in 1972